Phosphatase and actin regulator 1 (PHACTR1) is a protein that in humans is encoded by the PHACTR1 gene on chromosome 6. It is most significantly expressed in the globus pallidus of the brain. PHACTR1 is an actin and protein phosphatase 1 (PP1) binding protein that binds actin and regulates the reorganization of the actin cytoskeleton. This protein has been associated with coronary artery disease and migraines through genome-wide association studies. The PHACTR1 gene also contains one of 27 SNPs associated with increased risk of coronary artery disease.

Structure

Gene 
The PHACTR1 gene resides on chromosome 6 at the band 6p24.1 and includes 19 exons. This gene produces 2 isoforms through alternative splicing.

Protein 
PHACTR1 is a member of the phosphatase and actin regulator family and contains 4 RPEL repeats, three of which reside at the C-terminal and bind three actin monomers. PHACTR1 binds PP1 in the region containing these RPEL repeats. PHACTR1 wraps around PP1 in a similar way to other PP1 cofactors using a non-canonical RVxF motif, a ϕϕ motif, an Arg motif and a Trp motif. PHACTR1-PP1 complex is an active holophosphatase that binds and dephosphorylates substrates in sequence-denpendent manner.

PHACTR1 is also predicted to contain 8 PKA phosphorylation sites and 7 PKC phosphorylation sites found near the RPEL repeats.

Function 
PHACTR1 is a PP1 binding protein, which is reported to be highly expressed in brain and which controls PP1 activity and F-actin remodeling. PHACTR1 can be induced by NRP and VEGF through NRP-1 and VEGF-R1 receptors to control tubulogenesis, actin polymerization, and lamellipodial dynamics. Through this function, PHACTR1 is suggested to play a role in cell motility and vascular morphogenesis. Meanwhile, suppression of PHACTR1 increases expression of death cell receptors, leading to extrinsic apoptosis.

The PHACTR1 locus is commonly identified in multiple genome-wide association studies investigating coronary artery disease and myocardial infarction (MI). However, little is known about the function of PHACTR1 in the heart.

Clinical significance 
Upregulation of PHACTR1 by transforming growth factor (TGF)-β has been described in breast cancer cell lines, potentially pointing to a connection with the TGF-β signaling pathway, which is also implicated in genetic predisposition to migraines and has a key role in Marfan and Loeys-Dietz syndromes, two inherited connective tissue disorders causing aortic dissection.

In humans, genome-wide association studies have linked PHACTR1 to coronary artery disease. Considering that arterial calcification is a well-known risk factor for coronary artery disease and myocardial infarction, one study tested ∼2.5 million SNPs for an association with coronary artery calcification and aortic calcification in 2620 male individuals who were current or former heavy smokers and underwent chest CT scans in the NELSON trial. No SNPs were associated with aortic calcification on a genome-wide scale. The 9p21 locus was significantly associated with coronary artery calcification (rs1537370). Subsequently, two loci at ADAMTS7 (rs3825807) and at PHACTR1 (rs12526453) showed a nominally significant association with coronary artery calcification and an increased degree of arterial calcification.

Clinical marker 
Additionally, a multi-locus genetic risk score study based on a combination of 27 loci, including the PHACTR1 gene, identified individuals at increased risk for both incident and recurrent coronary artery disease events, as well as an enhanced clinical benefit from statin therapy. The study was based on a community cohort study (the Malmo Diet and Cancer study) and four additional randomized controlled trials of primary prevention cohorts (JUPITER and ASCOT) and secondary prevention cohorts (CARE and PROVE IT-TIMI 22).

Another genome-wide association study in 2,326 clinic-based German and Dutch individuals with migraine without aura identified that PHACTR1 (together with ASTN2) as susceptibility loci for migraine without aura, thereby expanding our knowledge of this debilitating neurological disorder.

References

Further reading 

 
 
 
 
 
 
 
 
 

Genes on human chromosome 6